Coon Rapids is a city in Carroll and Guthrie counties in the U.S. state of Iowa. The population was 1,300 at the 2020 census, which is a decrease of 5 from the 2000. The small portion of Coon Rapids that lies in Guthrie County is part of the Des Moines–West Des Moines Metropolitan Statistical Area.

History
 
Wheeling and dealing in public land marked the emergence of Carroll county. The county seat, Carrollton, was built on land given by two Fort Des Moines speculators. Two savvy Carrollton residents, Crocket Ribble and Jacob Cretsinger decided to try their hand in real estate. They purchased land along the Middle Raccoon River, built a saw and grist mill and went into business in 1864. Between the impact of the Civil War and later national panics, frontier settlement slowed down. However, the partners were able to establish a post office, named Coon Rapids; become a stop on stage coach service to Sioux City. Returning civil war veterans, William Minnich and his brother in law, Michael Shettler saw potential in the hamlet. After purchasing land, they submitted a plat for the village of Coon Rapids and built what would become a store-hotel and home for the Shettler family. Minnich maintained his farm in adjoining Guthrie County. Between 1870 and 1880, the hamlet grew as former farmers became merchants and tradesmen and newcomers came to the area. In addition to the Mill, the town had several general stores offering an array of goods, a hardware store, implement dealer and the all important real estate agent.

When the Chicago, St Paul and Milwaukee started to build a rail line about a half mile south west of the hamlet, they established a rough and tumble camp for their workers, many of whom were accompanied by their families. The railroad project provided jobs and good money for local boys and newcomers. A boom began. Between 1880 and 1886, merchants in the village of coon rapids literally moved their buildings into what the railroad had platted as a town. Main street slowly became lined with business houses and homes and the area between the old and new towns slowly was transformed into a residential area. The editor of the newly established newspaper, Coon Rapids Enterprise, bemoaned the lawlessness and intemperate behavior found in the new town. Selling liquor seemed to be the primary business! However, the town grew, nearly doubling in population and the new commercial center by the railroad expanded with a variety of new and old businesses. 1886 could have marked the end of Coon Rapids. A tornado ripped across western Iowa and Coon Rapids was in its path. The eastern part of town was demolished. Fortunately, only two in town had died, but the property damage within town and along the tornadoes route was immense. Help poured in from around the United States and the town rebuilt. However, this wooden frontier community was vulnerable to fire. Between 1887 and 1894, a multitude of fires occurred some caused by arson, others by lightning, and others the result of cinders from flues
igniting dry, shingled roofs.

During the late 19th century, Coon Rapids developed a modern, fireproof commercial district made up of brick buildings, exhibiting a variety of Victorian facades. Now this small brick city began to the amenities of urban life such as theater productions, roller skating, bowling, billiards, restaurants and a variety of shops and services, dray lines and livery barns. There were wooden sidewalks and street lights. A night watch and sheriff kept night time lawlessness in control and limited racing down Main street. Now there were community celebrations such as July 4 and Decoration Day for both town and rural folk . A town baseball team was another attraction. The town became a service center for a growing agricultural economy. Community wide events such as Decoration Day, Fourth of July celebration, and school graduations. Church and club celebrations became part of community life and served to integrate community and countryside.

In response to the increased town and rural population and agricultural specialization, Coon Rapids saw the appearance of service industries to support the changing farm economy. There were carpenters specializing in farm building construction, well diggers, tiling and drainage concerns, dealers in cement and other types of fencing, a creamery to support the burgeoning dairy and poultry industry. By the early twentieth century, Coon Rapids was the dominant trading center between Perry and Manning. The downtown was filled with two and three storey brick buildings and offered an array of shops, services, and amenities such as an opera house, bowling alley, restaurants, a hotel and other amusements. From a simple market and trading point, Coon Rapids had become the economic, social, recreational and service center for the four county areas. It continued in this role despite the fall in farm values in the late teens and Great Depression of the 1930s.

The entrepreneurial tradition that marks Coon Rapids was expressed in the twentieth century by businesses that served the diverse agricultural economy of the area. These included major grain dealers who maintained elevators in town, lumber men, implement dealers, a creamery and related produce stations, extensive poultry operations, a stock yard and sale barn. Of particular importance to the town's 20th century life was the emergence of the hybrid corn business.

Industrial agriculture transformed the Midwest in the post WW II era. Economies of scale shifted centers of production, for example, the poultry business became concentrated in the southeastern United States, the size of farms increased, corporate rather than individual farming operations became the norm. For Coon Rapids this had varied impacts. Garst and Thomas Seed had expanded into an international concern by the mid-1950s offering local employment opportunities . Garst and Thomas expanded physically, literally taking over many of the downtown buildings in Coon Rapids, converting them to laboratory and office space. The city's residential areas grew during the late twentieth century, largely due to the employment offered by Garst and Thomas. Although the range and variety of downtown shops and businesses changed between 1950 and the farm crisis of the 1980s, the town maintained basic services such as a grocery store, hardware store, real estate and insurance agencies, banks, lumber yard, and agricultural service businesses. In September 1959, Coon Rapids played a role in promoting détente between the United States and the Soviet Union, when area resident Roswell Garst hosted Soviet premier Nikita Khrushchev on his farm.

Twenty-first-century Coon Rapids lives on the tenacity and commitment of its residents. Syngenta, POET Biorefining, ET video and other local industries remain strong in large part to a dedicated and productive local workforce. Returning natives have energized the town. The Whiterock Conservancy, an innovation in eco-tourism, promises greater interest in Coon Rapids through its opportunities for year-round outdoor activities. A small but thriving arts and crafts community sponsors an annual art fair, offers classes, and sells paintings, baskets, clocks, pottery, stained glass, photographs, handmade furniture and wooden pens. In addition, a local musician has initiated a series of house concerts which are held in a variety of venues. City leaders and residents continue to work to improve the quality of life in the community with the expectation Coon Rapids will remain a viable rural Iowa town far into the future.

Geography

Coon Rapids' longitude and latitude coordinates in decimal form are 41.872462, 94.676787.
Coon Rapids is located along the Middle Raccoon River.

Demographics

2010 census
As of the census of 2010, there were 1,305 people, 550 households, and 337 families residing in the city. The racial makeup of the city was 97.7% White, 0.1% African American, 0.1% Native American, 1.4% from other races, and 0.8% from two or more races. Hispanic or Latino of any race were 3.3% of the population.

There were 550 households, of which 28.9% had children under the age of 18 living with them, 49.1% were married couples living together, 8.5% had a female householder with no husband present, 3.6% had a male householder with no wife present, and 38.7% were non-families. 35.3% of all households were made up of individuals, and 18.6% had someone living alone who was 65 years of age or older. The average household size was 2.30 and the average family size was 2.97.

The median age in the city was 41.3 years. 25.9% of residents were under the age of 18; 5.1% were between the ages of 18 and 24; 21.8% were from 25 to 44; 23.7% were from 45 to 64; and 23.4% were 65 years of age or older. The gender makeup of the city was 47.0% male and 53.0% female.

2000 census
As of the census of 2000, there were 1,305 people, 543 households, and 346 families residing in the city. The racial makeup of the city was 99.16% White, 0.61% African American, 0.15% Native American, and 0.08% from two or more races. Hispanic or Latino of any race were 1.76% of the population.

There were 543 households, out of which 27.8% had children under the age of 18 living with them, 53.6% were married couples living together, 7.9% had a female householder with no husband present, and 36.1% were non-families. 33.9% of all households were made up of individuals, and 19.7% had someone living alone who was 65 years of age or older. The average household size was 2.31 and the average family size was 2.95.

Age spread: 23.0% under the age of 18, 7.0% from 18 to 24, 23.0% from 25 to 44, 21.6% from 45 to 64, and 25.8% who were 65 years of age or older. The median age was 43 years. For every 100 females, there were 89.7 males. For every 100 females age 18 and over, there were 83.4 males.

The median income for a household in the city was $32,951, and the median income for a family was $39,800. Males had a median income of $29,018 versus $22,167 for females. The per capita income for the city was $16,765. About 6.8% of families and 9.1% of the population were below the poverty line, including 13.7% of those under age 18 and 7.7% of those age 67 or over.

Education
It is in the Coon Rapids–Bayard Community School District. The district was established on July 1, 1988, by the merger of the Bayard and Coon Rapids school districts.

Iowa Great Place
In October 2005, Coon Rapids-Whiterock area was elected a "Great Place" of Iowa for its rich history and resources, and creative future vision. The Great Places program, launched by Governor Tom Vilsack and implemented by the Department of Cultural Affairs, aimed to concentrate state agency resources on high-potential communities.

The local Great Place committee represents an alliance between the nonprofit Whiterock Conservancy, the City of Coon Rapids, and the Coon Rapids Development Group. Whiterock Conservancy is an Iowan nonprofit organized in late 2004 to administer a  private conservation land donation from the Garst family of Coon Rapids.  Its goals are environmental restoration, sustainable agriculture, and low-impact public use and education.

The first three Iowa Great Places (Coon Rapids, Clinton and Sioux City) were each awarded $1 million in seed money by the Iowa legislature. In September 2007, Coon Rapids was also awarded a $1.7 million Vision Iowa grant.  The Coon Rapids Great Place Program combines natural resource restoration with trails, public park development, elder care, diversity, historic preservation, microenterprise support, and tourism marketing.

Notable people

Warren Garst (1850–1924) Nineteenth Governor of Iowa
Roswell Garst (1898–1977) Internationally prominent farmer and hosted Nikita Khrushchev at his farm
David Garst (1926–2006) President of Garst Seed Company Worked for different presidential administrations
Jay King "Babe" Towne (1880–1938) MLB played for the winning 1906 World Series team the Chicago White Sox

See also

 Roswell and Elizabeth Garst Farmstead Historic District
 Whiterock Conservancy
 Krushchev in Iowa Trail

References

External links

Coon Rapids, Iowa
Coon Rapids Tourism Guide
City-Data Comprehensive Statistical Data and more about Coon Rapids

Cities in Carroll County, Iowa
Cities in Guthrie County, Iowa
Cities in Iowa
Des Moines metropolitan area
Populated places established in 1864
1864 establishments in Iowa